David M. Silberman is an American government administrator who served as the Associate Director for Research, Markets, and Regulation at the Consumer Financial Protection Bureau. Silberman also previously served as the agency's Acting Deputy Director, until the appointment of Leandra English to the office.

Career 
Silberman began his law career as a clerk for D.C. Circuit Judge David Bazelon, Supreme Court Justice Thurgood Marshall, and later as a member of the law firm Bredhoff & Kaiser.

Before joining the Consumer Financial Protection Bureau, Silberman served as general counsel and Executive Vice President of Kessler Financial Services. The company's focus is to "develop more effective partnerships, optimize the value of credit card portfolios, fund risk-based marketing campaigns, and develop and execute marketing strategies."

Silberman served as President and CEO of Union Privilege while he was deputy general counsel of the AFL–CIO. The company provided financial services to union members, as well as the first AFL-CIO credit card program.

Silberman has argued three cases before the Supreme Court and briefed many others.

Personal life 
He is the son of Charles E. Silberman. He is married to Claire Engers. He has three sons: Peter, Eric, and Jonathan.

See also 
 List of law clerks of the Supreme Court of the United States (Seat 10)

References 

Living people
Obama administration personnel
Trump administration personnel
Harvard Law School alumni
Brandeis University alumni
Law clerks of the Supreme Court of the United States
People of the Consumer Financial Protection Bureau
American lawyers
AFL–CIO people
Year of birth missing (living people)